Dreyfuss is a surname; notable people with this surname include:

Barney Dreyfuss (1865–1932), baseball entrepreneur, co-founder of the World Series
Gideon Dreyfuss, molecular biologist, Howard Hughes Medical Institute and University of Pennsylvania
Henry Dreyfuss (1904–1972), industrial designer
Joel Dreyfuss (born 1945), editor-in-chief of Red Herring
Richard Dreyfuss (born 1947), American actor
Robert Dreyfuss, American freelance investigative journalist
Rochelle C. Dreyfuss, American law professor

See also
 Dreyfus (disambiguation), Dreyfus (surname)
 Dreifuss
 Orvil Dryfoos (1912–1963), publisher of The New York Times from 1961 to 1963

Jewish surnames
German-language surnames